The 2020 BNP Paribas Open (also known as the 2020 Indian Wells Masters) was a professional men and women's tennis tournament to be played in Indian Wells, California. The event was initially scheduled to take place on March 11–22, 2020, but was canceled due to the COVID-19 pandemic.

It was to be the 47th edition of the men's event and 32nd of the women's event, and would be classified as an ATP Tour Masters 1000 event on the 2020 ATP Tour and a Premier Mandatory event on the 2020 WTA Tour. Both the men's and the women's events would be scheduled to take place at the Indian Wells Tennis Garden in Indian Wells, California on outdoor hard courts.

All top 75 ranked WTA and ATP Tour singles players were included in the initial entry list, but five-time champion Roger Federer withdrew after undergoing surgery on his right knee.

Dominic Thiem and Bianca Andreescu were the defending champions in the men's and women's singles draw, respectively prior to the cancellation, although Andreescu withdrew prior to the originally scheduled start of the tournament, citing injury.

Impact of the COVID-19 pandemic

Just days before the start of the qualifying rounds, the wider spread of COVID-19 recorded a presumptive case in the state of California after declared a public health emergency in the Coachella Valley, in accordance with the Riverside County Health Department and CDC. In the planned format, the tournament would have taken place without spectators, personnel (including ball kids) must wear gloves for protective safety to avoid the risk of spreading the disease, and not to allow players holding towels or signing post-match in-person autographs via camera.

On March 8, 2020, organizers had announced the tournament would be cancelled due to the rising virus fears, becoming the first global sporting event to be cancelled. Never less, the ATP and WTA Tours were subsequently suspended on March 12 including the Miami Open, which was due to be held after the tournament. Other sporting events have held in the month like the National Basketball Association had to indefinitely suspend its 2019–20 season after a player tested positive for the virus, the National Collegiate Athletic Association had to schedule its men's basketball tournament cancelled just days before it would have begun, the National Hockey League suspended its season indefinitely, and Major League Soccer suspended its season just a few games have been played. Tennis players' rankings in both seasons have started to be frozen on March 16, into a further extension of suspension of both tours until resumption of tennis events in August. This event was not included in the revised tennis schedule for the latter of 2020. Tournament director and former world number 2, Tommy Haas, told the press "We are prepared to hold the tournament on another date and will explore options."

In response of the tournament's cancellation, none of the players had tested positive for the virus. The state of California itself, later restricted mass gatherings up to 500 people to later in the year until a COVID-19 vaccine is found.

This edition of Indian Wells was initially rescheduled to March 8 to 21, 2021, but was further rescheduled to October 4 to 17, and in the end, neither Thiem and Andreescu defended their titles, Cameron Norrie and Paula Badosa won the men's and women's singles titles, respectively.

Players
The following players were due to compete in the tournament prior to its cancellation.

ATP singles main-draw entrants

Seeds
The following would have the seeded players. Seedings would have been based on ATP rankings as of March 9, 2020. Rank and points before were also as of March 9, 2020.

The following players would have been seeded, but withdrew from the event.

Other entrants
The following players received wildcards into the singles main draw:
  Marcos Giron
  Mitchell Krueger
  Brandon Nakashima
  Tennys Sandgren
  Jack Sock

The following players received entry using a protected ranking into the singles main draw:
  Lu Yen-hsun
  Mackenzie McDonald
  Vasek Pospisil

The following players received entry from the qualifying draw:
 Qualifying not played following its cancellation

Withdrawals
  Kevin Anderson → replaced by  Federico Delbonis
  Alexandr Dolgopolov → replaced by  Mackenzie McDonald
  Roger Federer → replaced by  Philipp Kohlschreiber
  Kei Nishikori → replaced by  Tommy Paul
  Guido Pella → replaced by  Jannik Sinner
  Albert Ramos Viñolas → replaced by  Roberto Carballés Baena
  Jo-Wilfried Tsonga → replaced by  Mikael Ymer

ATP doubles main-draw entrants

Seeds 

1 Rankings as of March 9, 2020.

Other entrants
The following pairs received wildcards into the doubles main draw:
 Wildcards not named following its cancellation

WTA singles main-draw entrants

Seeds
The following would have the seeded players. Seedings would have been based on WTA rankings as of March 2, 2020. Rank and points before were as of March 9, 2020.

† The player did not qualify for the tournament in 2019. Accordingly, points from her 16th best result are deducted instead.

The following players would have been seeded, but withdrew from the event.

Other entrants
The following players received wildcards into the singles main draw:
  Kristie Ahn 
  Usue Maitane Arconada
  Madison Brengle
  Kim Clijsters
  Leylah Annie Fernandez
  Christina McHale
  Caty McNally
 Last remaining wildcard slot not used following its cancellation

The following players received entry using a protected ranking into the singles main draw:
  Shelby Rogers
  Yaroslava Shvedova

The following players received entry from the qualifying draw:
 Qualifying not played following its cancellation

Withdrawals 
Before the tournament
  Bianca Andreescu → replaced by  Shelby Rogers 
  Victoria Azarenka → replaced by  Misaki Doi
  Danielle Collins → replaced by  Ons Jabeur
  Simona Halep → replaced by  Taylor Townsend
  Angelique Kerber → replaced by  Kirsten Flipkens

WTA doubles main-draw entrants

Seeds 

1 Rankings as of March 2, 2020.

Other entrants
The following pairs received wildcards into the doubles main draw:
  Kim Clijsters /  Sloane Stephens 
 Remaining wildcard slots not used following its cancellation

Notes

References

External links

2020 BNP Paribas Open
2020 ATP Tour
2020 WTA Tour
2020 in American tennis
March 2020 sports events in the United States
2020 in sports in California
Tennis events cancelled due to the COVID-19 pandemic